Coleophora potentillae is a moth of the family Coleophoridae. It is found from Fennoscandia to the Pyrenees, and from Ireland to Poland.

Description
The wingspan is 8–10 mm. Coleophora species have narrow blunt to pointed forewings and a weakly defined tornus. The hindwings are narrow-elongate and very long-fringed. The upper surfaces have neither a discal spot nor transverse lines. Each abdomen segment of the abdomen has paired patches of tiny spines which show through the scales. The resting position is horizontal with the front end raised and the cilia give the hind tip a frayed and upturned look if the wings are rolled around the body. C. potentillae characteristics include: Head shining bronze. Antennae white, ringed with dark fuscous, basal joint dark fuscous. Forewings rather shining bronze or greyish-bronze. Hindwings dark grey.

Adults are on wing from June to August and there is one generation per year.

The larvae feed on Rosaceae herbs and shrubs (Potentilla, Rosa, Rubus) and some other plants (e.g. Helianthemum or birches, Betula). They create an off-white (sometimes darker) lobed case, that lies almost flat on the leaf. It has a mouth angle of 30°-50°. The lobes are cut from the lower epidermis. Full-grown larvae can be found in autumn.

References

External links
 
Bestimmungshilfe für die in Europa nachgewiesenen Schmetterlingsarten
Species info
Lepidoptera of Belgium

potentillae
Moths described in 1885
Moths of Europe